Tidal is an unincorporated community in Madison Township, Armstrong County, Pennsylvania, United States.

History
A post office called Tidal was established in 1888 and remained in operation until 1940.

References

Unincorporated communities in Armstrong County, Pennsylvania
Unincorporated communities in Pennsylvania